Transfer may refer to:

Arts and media
Transfer (2010 film), a German science-fiction movie directed by Damir Lukacevic and starring Zana Marjanović
Transfer (1966 film), a short film
 Transfer (journal), in management studies
"The Transfer" (Smash), a television episode
The Transfer, a novel by Silvano Ceccherini

Finance
 Transfer payment, a redistribution of income and wealth by means of the government making a payment
 Balance transfer, transfer of the balance (either of money or credit) in an account to another account
 Money transfer (disambiguation)
 Wire transfer, an international expedited bank-to-bank funds transfer

Science and technology

Learning and psychology
 Transfer (propaganda), a method of psychological manipulation
 Knowledge transfer, within organizations
 Language transfer, in which native-language grammar and pronunciation influence the learning and use of a second language
 Transfer of learning, in education

Mathematics
 Transfer function in mathematics
 Transfer (group theory), a type of homomorphism
 Transfer principle, in mathematics

Other sciences
 Transfer (computing), movement of data between memory media
 Transfer (patent), transfer of intellectual property rights
 Call transfer, in telephony
 Electron transfer, in chemistry
 Heat transfer, in thermal engineering
 Population transfer, movement of large groups of people
 Transfer DNA, the transferred DNA of the tumor-inducing (Ti) plasmid of some species of bacteria such as Agrobacterium tumefaciens
 Fouling, transfer of unwanted material onto solid surfaces
 Trace evidence, in forensic science

Sports and games
 Transfer (association football)
 Transfer, a type of bidding convention in contract bridge
 Jacoby transfer
 Texas transfer

Transportation
 Transfer (public transit), a ticket that allows a passenger to use multiple conveyances in a single trip
 Transfer (railway station), a railway station connecting two or more lines
 Transfer (travel), local transportation as part of an itinerary

Other uses
 Transfer, Pennsylvania
 Internal hiring, a move to another job in another team in the same organization
 Intra-company transfer
 College transfer
 Decal, a sticker
 Iron-on transfer
 The process of moving a human to or from a wheelchair or other assistive device

See also
 Manhattan Transfer (disambiguation), several meanings